Western Canada High School (WCHS) is a public senior high school in Calgary, Alberta, Canada.  It has classes for grades 10 through 12.  Western is located in the 17th Avenue business district of the Lower Mount Royal community, and is the most centrally located public high school in Calgary. In terms of academics, it is the top-ranked public high school in Calgary.

History
The original school building was completed in 1903 as an Egyptian-style exclusive high school for boys called Western Canada College (not a college in the North American sense of the word).  It was created by "The Western Canada College Bill of Incorporating Ordinance" enacted by the Government of the Northwest Territories, which Calgary was then a part of before the province of Alberta was created in 1905. To raise money for the new college, 5000 shares were sold for $10 each. Many of the original investors read like a "Who's Who" list for Alberta; Pat Burns, R. B. Bennett, A.E. Cross, William Pearce, A.C. Rutherford (who was premier at the time), and George Lane.

A granite shaft bearing a Cross of Sacrifice was dedicated as a list of honor memorial to Western Canada College students who were killed during the First World War and who served during the Second World War, the Korean War and as peacekeepers.

Academics

Special programs
The school provides French and English language as a primary language instruction.  In addition, it is one of a select number of schools in Calgary to offer French immersion. Western is one of a small number of Calgary high schools to offer an International Baccalaureate (IB) Diploma Programme. The school also offers an extensive performing and visual arts program, and offers a certificate to recognize students that have made fine arts a focus of learning at the high school level. The school is part of the Action for Bright Children Society.

Athletics
The Western Redhawks compete under the governance of the Alberta Schools Athletic Association and Calgary Senior High School Athletic Association

The school boasts teams in the following sports:

 Badminton
 Ping Pong
 Basketball
 Cheerleading
 Cross Country
 Formula 1
 Field Hockey
 Football
 Underwater Hockey
 Rugby
 Soccer
 Swim and Dive
 Track and Field
 Ultimate Frisbee
 Slapboxing
 Slamball
 Volleyball
 Wrestling
 Dance

Notable alumni

Ron Allbright – CFL player 1956–1967
Conrad Bain – actor
Ryan Belleville – actor, writer
Barney Bentall – singer/songwriter
 Braids – art rock band
Karen Connelly – novelist and poet
Jim Dinning – Member of the Legislative Assembly of Alberta 1986–1997
Reid Duke – first hockey player signed by the Vegas Golden Knights
Emerson Frostad – baseball player
George Hansen – CFL player 1959–1966
Dan Hays – Senator 1984–2007 
Norman Kwong – CFL player 1948–1960; Lieutenant Governor of Alberta 2005–2010
Jack Leslie – Mayor of Calgary 1965–1969
Jan Lisiecki – concert pianist
Suzette Mayr – novelist and poet
Tate McRae – dancer and singer (born 2003)
Josh Morrissey – defenceman, Winnipeg Jets
Carl Nickle – founder of the Daily Oil Bulletin; Member of Parliament 1951–1957
Mark Oldershaw – athlete and businessman
Larry Robinson – CFL player 1961–1975
Lorna Slater - Scottish politician
Kinnie Starr – singer/songwriter
David Swann – politician, father of Jacob Swan
Taryn Swiatek – soccer player

References

External links

Western Canada High School

Educational institutions established in 1903
High schools in Calgary
International Baccalaureate schools in Alberta
1903 establishments in the Northwest Territories
Western Canada High School